"Die da!?" ("Her?! The one over there?!") is a song by the German hip hop group Die Fantastischen Vier. It was released in 1992 from the album 4 gewinnt and samples Asha Puthli's song "Right Down Here".

Track list 
CD
 Die da!?! (Radio Mix) (3:38)
 Die da!?! (Maxi Mix) (5:39)
 Wer da?! (Trance Mix) [Who is here?!] (6:11)
Maxi vinyl
 Die da!?! (Maxi Mix) (5:39)
 Wer da?! (Trance Mix) (6:11)

Charts

References 
 

1992 singles
Die Fantastischen Vier songs
1992 songs
Columbia Records singles
Songs written by Thomas D
German-language songs
Number-one singles in Austria
Number-one singles in Switzerland